The 2002–03 Serbia and Montenegro Cup (in fall season FR Yugoslavia Cup) was the eleventh and last under the name FR Yugoslavia and (after was the country renamed in February 2003) first season of the Serbia and Montenegro's annual football cup. The cup defenders (last winners of the FR Yugoslavia Cup) was Red Star Belgrade, but was defeated by FK Sartid in the final.

First round
Thirty-two teams entered in the First Round. The matches were played on 10, 11 and 18 September 2002.

|}
1The match was played in Raška.Note: Roman numerals in brackets denote the league tier the clubs participated in the 2002–03 season.

Second round
The 16 winners from the prior round enter this round. The matches were played on 24 and 25 September 2002.

|}
Note: Roman numerals in brackets denote the league tier the clubs participated in the 2002–03 season.

Quarter-finals
The eight winners from the prior round enter this round. The matches were played on 27 November 2002.

|}
Note: Roman numerals in brackets denote the league tier the clubs participated in the 2002–03 season.

Semi-finals
The four winners from the prior round enter this round. The matches were played on 9 April 2003.

|}
Note: Roman numerals in brackets denote the league tier the clubs participated in the 2002–03 season.

Final

See also
 2002–03 First League of Serbia and Montenegro
 2002–03 Second League of Serbia and Montenegro

References

External links
Results on RSSSF

Serbia and Montenegro Cup
Cup
Cup
Serbia